Olney is a city in Young County, Texas, United States. Its population was 3,007 in 2020.

History
On May 18, 1951, the city was devastated by a violent F4 tornado. Thomas P. Grazulis noted this tornado was possible F5 on the Fujita scale.

Geography

Olney is located at  (33.368181, –98.758012).

According to the United States Census Bureau, the city has a total area of 2.0 sq mi (5.2 km), all of it land. The town is 45 miles south of Wichita Falls.

Demographics

2020 census

As of the 2020 United States census, there were 3,007 people, 1,370 households, and 821 families residing in the city.

2000 census
As of the census of 2000,  3,396 people, 1,405 households, and 896 families were residing in the city. The population density was 1,654.8 people/s mi (639.6/km). The 1,668 housing units averaged 812.8/sq mi (314.2/km). The racial makeup of the city was 89.78% White, 2.47% African American, 0.80% Native American, 0.12% Asian, 4.62% from other races, and 2.21% from two or more races. Hispanics or Latinos of any race were 14.43% of the population.

Out of the 1,405 households,  31.0% had children under 18 living with them, 47.3% were married couples living together, 12.9% had a female householder with no husband present, and 36.2% were not families. About 33.0% of all households were made up of individuals, and 18.0% had someone living alone who was 65 or older. The average household size was 2.34, and the average family size was 2.97.

In the city, the age distribution was  25.9% under 18, 7.9% from 18 to 24, 24.0% from 25 to 44, 20.3% from 45 to 64, and 22.0% who were 65 or older. The median age was 40 years. For every 100 females, there were 81.9 males. For every 100 females age 18 and over, there were 76.3 males.

The median income for a household in the city was $21,991, and for a family was $29,274. Males had a median income of $27,500 versus $16,466 for females. The per capita income for the city was $13,723. About 18.3% of families and 21.4% of the population were below the poverty line, including 24.8% of those under age 18 and 20.3% of those age 65 or over.

Olney Community Library and Arts Center
The Olney Community Library and Arts Center is located on the Olney school campus at 807 W. Hamilton.

Photo Gallery 
Olney is the home of the One-Arm Dove Hunt.

Education
Olney is served by the Olney Independent School District.

The designated community college for most of Young County (including Olney ISD) is Ranger Junior College.

Commerce
Olney Municipal Airport is 3 miles southwest of the city, and includes the Air Tractor company with 270 employees, manufacturing agricultural aircraft. The airport is the flight test site for the Carter PAV, as well as training for the 2014 Red Bull Air Race World Championship.

Notable people

 Kyle Clifton, former National Football League (NFL) player
 Jim Grisham, former NFL player
 George D. Keathley, Medal of Honor recipient
 Bob Lilly, "Mr. Cowboy",  former Dallas Cowboy defensive tackle and member of the Pro Football Hall of Fame
 Bob Oliver, American football player
 Johnny Vaught, legendary Ole Miss head coach, member of the College Football Hall of Fame
 James Vick, UFC lightweight fighter

Climate
The climate in this area is characterized by hot, humid summers and generally mild to cool winters.  According to the Köppen climate classification, Olney has a humid subtropical climate, Cfa on maps.

References

External links
 City of Olney, Texas official website
Olney Chamber of Commerce website
 The Handbook of Texas Online: Olney, Texas
 One Arm Dove Hunt official website
 Olney Enterprise

Cities in Texas
Cities in Young County, Texas